Sir Rowland Hill (1795–1879) introduced postal reforms in the UK that led to the issuance of the world's first postage stamps.

Rowland Hill or Roland Hill may also refer to:
 Roland Hill (cricketer) (1868-1929), Australian cricketer
 Roland Hill (journalist) (1920–2014), British journalist and biographer
 Rowland Hill (MP) of Soulton (c. 1495–1561), Lord Mayor of London and publisher of the Geneva Bible 
 Sir Rowland Hill, 1st Baronet (1705–1783), first of the Hill Baronets, of Hawkstone
 Rowland Hill (preacher) (1744–1833), nonconformist leader and vaccination advocate
 Rowland Hill, 1st Viscount Hill (1772–1842), British military commander in the Napoleonic Wars
 Rowland Hill, 2nd Viscount Hill (1800–1875), British peer and MP for Shropshire
 Rowland Broadhurst Hill, Australian politician
 Rowland Hill (cricketer) (1851–1912), English cricketer
 Rowland Clegg-Hill, 3rd Viscount Hill (1833–1895), British peer
 Sir George Rowland Hill (1855–1928), English rugby union administrator
 Rowland Richard Clegg-Hill, 4th Viscount Hill (1863–1923), British peer

See also
 Viscount Hill